Gurutze Fernández Callejo, commonly known as Guru (born 4 May 1979), is a Spanish retired football forward who represented Athletic Bilbao and Levante UD of the Primera División.

She has won Superliga Femenina four times—thrice with Athletic Bilbao and once with Levante UD. As of the end of the 2008–09 season she had scored 35 goals in 146 games played throughout six seasons in the Superliga. Guru returned to Athletic in October 2009 after two seasons away at Levante. She announced her retirement in July 2013, publishing an open letter of thanks to Athletic's club staff and supporters.

References

External links
profile at Levante UD
profile at Athletic Club

1979 births
Athletic Club Femenino players
Footballers from the Basque Country (autonomous community)
Levante UD Femenino players
Living people
Primera División (women) players
Spain women's international footballers
Spanish women's footballers
People from Urola Kosta
Oiartzun KE players
SD Eibar Femenino players
Women's association football forwards